Antai College of Economics and Management (ACEM) is the business school of Shanghai Jiao Tong University in Shanghai, China. It was founded in 1918 as the School of Transportation Management and renamed the School of Management in 1931. The school offers both undergraduate and postgraduate programs, including a full-time MBA program, various executive education programs, and multiple PhD programs.

Today, Antai is ranked 1st by Financial Times for the Asia-Pacific region (2018), symbolizing rapid growth against its regional counterparts such as National University of Singapore (ranked 3rd), Hong Kong University of Science and Technology (ranked 5th) and University of Melbourne (ranked 10th). Globally, its executive MBA program was ranked 8th overall and 1st in terms of salary growth (2018).

History 

The history of Antai College is linked to that of its parent: Shanghai Jiao Tong University. This university was founded in 1896 as Nanyang Public School  by an imperial edict issued by the Guangxu Emperor, under the Business and Telegraphs Office of the imperial government. In 1918, the name of the post-revolution university was changed to Nan Yan College of Chiao Tung and the school started specializing in transportation and communication.

In the same year, the Railway Management Department of Shanghai Jiao Tong University was established. In 1984, the reestablishment of the name Management School of Shanghai Jiao Tong University was approved by the Ministry of Education. In 1996, Aetna International Group of the USA invested in the Management School, allowing it to grow to an influential regional institution. Finally in 2000, the school changed its name to Antai College of Economics and Management. Entering the 21st century, large investments allowed the school to expand its educational offering, extend its international reach and invest in state-of-the art facilities in downtown Shanghai.

Education 

Since 2011, Antai College is accredited by AACSB, AMBA and EQUIS.

As of 2018, the school offers a range of undergraduate, postgraduate, doctoral and executive education programs; 
 Undergraduate: Bachelor of Economics and Bachelor of Finance.
 Graduate: Master of Applied Economics (Chinese taught),  MSc.BA (Chinese taught), Master of Management Science and Engineering (Chinese taught)
 Postgraduate: , MIM (English taught), MBA (English and Chinese tracks), Global Operations (dual-degree with MIT Sloan School of Management).
 Doctoral: Management Science and Engineering, Business Administration, and Applied Economics.
 Executive Education: EMBA with ESADE Business School (English and Chinese tracks), Master of Professional Accounting (PAcc), and various corporate/tailored programs.

Students and faculty  
Since the school is considered to be quite selective, class sizes remain relatively small. Each year ACEM receives and sends out over 170 undergraduate, graduate and MBA students for exchange. The school has also developed more than 90 English-taught courses at various levels. In addition to traditional one-term student exchanges, it also provides customized China-based study tours, summer programs, overseas internship exchange projects, and overseas study tours for EMBA and executive education participants.

The percentage of faculty members with overseas doctorate degrees has grown to 34%.

Notable alumni 
 Marjorie Yang, Chairman of Esquel Group
 Fan Min, Co-founder, vice chairman and president of Ctrip
 Ling Weng, CEO of China Energy Investment
 Wang Junhao,  vice chairman of the Juneyao Group
 Yao Ming, retired NBA basketball player

Rankings

References

Universities and colleges in China